Grapevine is an unincorporated community in Grant County, Arkansas, United States. Grapevine has a post office with ZIP code 72057. Grapevine is home to the famous R&C hunting club.

It is served by the Sheridan School District. The Grapevine School District served it until July 1, 1985, when it consolidated into the Sheridan district.

References

Unincorporated communities in Grant County, Arkansas
Unincorporated communities in Arkansas